Sadiq Sani Sadiq (born 2 February 1981) is a Nigerian film actor. In 2012, he appeared in Blood and Henna, a Nigerian film directed by Kenneth Gyang, along with Nafisat Abdullahi and Ali Nuhu. He has received awards and nominations including 2015 Kannywood Awards in jurors award category organized by MTN Nigeria. He was also awarded by the City People Entertainment award in 2014 and 2017. He is married with two children.

Awards

Filmography
Sadiq has been cast in more than 200 Kannywood movies.

See also
 List of Nigerian actors
 List of Kannywood actors

References

1981 births
Nigerian male film actors
Hausa-language mass media
Living people
Male actors in Hausa cinema
People from Plateau State
Kannywood actors
Actors in Hausa cinema
Actors from Plateau State
21st-century Nigerian male actors
Nigerian film award winners